Milton Knight Jr. (May 12, 1962) is an American cartoonist, animator, comic book artist, writer, painter, and storyboard/layout artist. He directed animation for a variety of cartoon series, including Cool World, Adventures of Sonic the Hedgehog, and The Twisted Tales of Felix the Cat. He is known for his Golden Age (1930s) cartooning style.

Gary Groth described Knight as "clearly a maladjusted oddball, but it was precisely because of this [Groth] liked him."

Biography

Early life 
On May 12, 1962, Milton Knight Jr. was born in Mineola, New York. At age two, Knight began to draw, paint, and create comic books and animation. Knight collected Chinese watercolors, poster art, Charlie Brown comics, and Terrytoons, all of which inspired his own works. When visiting New York museums and galleries as a child, Knight was captivated by pop artists' combination of comic strips and fine art.

Regardless of his medium, Knight's interest in art creation is "not in recapturing or approximating reality, but in creating new forms and abstractions and giving them their own unique life."

Illustrator 
From 1979 on, he illustrated for national magazines and newspapers: The Village Voice, Family Weekly, Nickelodeon Magazine, The Electric Company Magazine, National Lampoon, High Times, Heavy Metal, and others. 

He has designed comic books, record covers, posters, candy, and T-shirts.

Comics 
Circa 1982, Mike Harris, who was familiar with Milton Knight's comic Hugo, connected Knight with Kim Thompson and Gary Groth of graphic novel publisher Fantagraphics. In 1982, they published Hugo, Knight's one-shot billed as "fairy tales for adults." Thompson described it as a "pretty dark, bleak, and frankly misogynistic view of life...poured [into] a funny-animal comic...quite fascinating." Fantagraphics brought the title back as a three-issue series in 1984–85, and later collected it as a trade paperback.

Knight also wrote and drew the ten-issue Marvel Comics series Mighty Mouse, a spin-off of the Ralph Bakshi project The New Adventures.

Animation 
Knight moved to California in 1991, where he became an animator for TV cartoons, specifically by breaking in as a director on The Twisted Tales of Felix the Cat.  He developed the art, character, props, background, storyboard, and color designs of animated cartoons for Disney TV, MGM TV, Saban, Rhythm & Hues, Warner Bros. Animation, HBO, and others; notable titles included Ralph Bakshi's Cool World, Adventures of Sonic the Hedgehog, and The Twisted Tales of Felix the Cat.

Knight teaches art at The Colonnade Art Gallery and Studio in Pasadena, California. He is an animation archive volunteer for the International Animated Film Association.

In 2021, CBR announced that Knight would provide commentary for the Blu-Ray release of Adventures of Sonic the Hedgehog, which provided all 65 episodes. The compilation was released in February 2022 featuring Knight's commentary.

Hate crime incident 
On February 25, 2019, Knight reported on his Facebook account that he had been a victim of a hate crime on the same day. He recounted that while he was waiting for the bus, a man provoked Knight with racial slurs and then repeatedly punched him in the head when Knight confronted him, resulting in "cuts, a broken nose, and more" to Knight and "a busted fist" to the perpetrator which both required hospitalization. Knight mentioned that he had pressed charges against his assailant for assault and battery.

Bibliography

Animation
 Cool World (Ralph Bakshi/Paramount, 1992) — character designer, layout, animation
 Battletoads (TV movie, 1992) — storyboard/layout artist
 Adventures of Sonic the Hedgehog (DIC Entertainment, 1993) — story, storyboard artist character, background & prop design, layout, animation.
 The Twisted Tales of Felix the Cat (Film Roman, 1995) — directed four shorts, co-writer
 The Mouse and the Monster (Saban, 1996) — storyboard artist, etc.
 Safety spot for the California Department of Water Resources (Baer Animation) — director, animator
 Johnny Test (2005) — storyboard artist - "The Return of Johnny X" 
 Class of 3000 (2006) — storyboard artist
 Attila and the Great Blue Bean (2007) — illustrations
 Caprice! - independent cartoon planned, not made
 Popeye - Barbecue for Two: Reanimate Collab (TBA)

Comics
 Teenage Mutant Ninja Turtles (Murakami-Wolf-Swenson, 1990)
 Mighty Mouse (Marvel Comics, 1990–1991) — 10-issue series
 Betty Boop's Big Break
 Graphic Classics (Eureka Productions, 2001–2016) — paperback series; H.G. Wells, Edgar Allan Poe, and Arthur Conan Doyle adaptations
 Harveyville Fun Times!
  The Graphic Canon (Seven Stories Press) — "Poker!" (Zora Neale Hurston adaptation)
 Molasses (Syrup Pirates, 2014 - 2015) - "Blackbird Pie", "Adolph"

Eurotic/Adult comics
 Hugo (Fantagraphics Books, 1982, 1984–1985) — first published comics work
 Screw strips, including "Wolfo"
 Heavy Metal strips (1980s)
 Mack
 Midnite the Rebel Skunk (1986–1987)
 Moonie (Moonchild) (MU Press)
 Nanny Dickering
 Slug 'n' Ginger — under the pen name Lou Hepton (1982–present)
 Wild Kingdom (Mu Press)
 Zoe (in High Times)
 Hinkley (MU Press)

 World War 3 Illustrated

Music album covers
 Sheiks and Vamps 1920's Dance Bands Vol. 1
 Laughter from the Hip (1989)
 The Definitive Fats Waller, Vol. 2: Hallelujah (1991)
 The Raymond Scott Project, Volume 1: Powerhouse (Stash Records, 1992)
 Halloween Stomp: Haunted House Party (Jass Records, 1993)
 Que Rico! Mozambique (Esrico Music, 1996) — Ricardo Estrada
 Viper Mad Blues: Songs Of Dope & Depravity (Mojo Records, 1996)
 Sissy Man Blues (Mojo Records, 1999)

References

External links
  (archived from original)

 
 Milton Knight - The World of Knight - Pasadena, California
 
 GRAPHIC CLASSICS bio (archived from original)
 Knight bio at ComicVine

1962 births
Living people
American animators
American comics artists
African-American comics creators
American comics creators
American storyboard artists
21st-century African-American people
20th-century African-American people